Geoffrey Cain is an American journalist, author, and writer and anthropologist. He specializes in geopolitics and technology. His work has appeared in The Economist, Time, Wired (magazine), Foreign Policy, The New Republic and The Wall Street Journal. Cain is also a regular commentator on Bloomberg TV, BBC, CNN, and NPR.

Cain's work in this field led to him to write his first book, Samsung Rising. It was released by Crown Publishing on 17 March, 2020, and has been quoted in various mainstream media. Samsung's communication department has criticized his statements on the company.

In August 2017, he was sensationally accused of spying by news media aligned with the Cambodian People's Party. This was part of a political crackdown leading up to the arrest of Kem Sokha, the former leader of the now-disbanded opposition party, on treason charges.

In 2021, he released his second book, The Perfect Police State: An Undercover Odyssey into China's Terrifying Surveillance Dystopia of the Future, published by PublicAffairs. He received the citation for the Cornelius Ryan Award for this book.

Education
Cain attended The George Washington University in Washington, D.C., where he received his BA. His studies continued in London, where he received an MA with distinction from the School of Oriental and African Studies. He was also a Fulbright scholar in Vietnam.

Career
Cain began his career as a journalist in Asia, working predominantly in Vietnam and Cambodia. From 2008 onwards, he worked for The Economist.

Cain settled in South Korea in 2009 as a writer for Time, covering politics, business and culture in North and South Korea. In 2015, he took a train across North Korea, visiting Pyongyang and remote places in the north of the country. His train journey received coverage in a number of newspapers in the west, including The Telegraph.

In 2012, he joined GlobalPost where he was the Senior Correspondent for Japan and Korea.

From 2014 onwards, Cain became engaged in a dispute with the Cambodian government following a series of reports he published in 2014 on labor crackdowns in the country. His work on the subject led Cain to be a finalist for the Society of Publishers in Asia
(SOPA) award.

In August 2017, he was accused of spying on Cambodia by news media aligned with Prime Minister Hun Sen and collaborating with the opposition party, Cambodia National Rescue Party. Cain flatly denied the claims, stating he knew Samathida Kem, the opposition leader's daughter, from University in the United States.

In November 2017, he wrote an article for The Nation, speaking about Kem Sokha's arrest in September of that year. By this point, the opposition leader had been charged with treason by the ruling party of Cambodia.

During the same period, Cain reported on the alleged growing backlash in South Korea against the power of a number of large family-owned businesses, known as the chaebol. These included corporations such as Samsung, Hyundai and LG. He regularly commented in the media and wrote a number of articles on the subject of Samsung's involvement in the 2016 South Korean political scandal. After Lee Jae-yong was arrested as part of a bribery scandal linked to a controversial 2015 merger, and then was released from prison in February 2018 when a court reduced but upheld his bribery conviction, Cain frequently spoke about South Korea's alleged leniency on white collar crime.

Cain served as an advisor to the United States House Foreign Affairs Committee, a term member of the Council on Foreign Relations and is a senior fellow for advanced critical emerging technologies at Lincoln Network, a non-profit organization and a tech-policy think-tank.

Books
The Perfect Police State: An Undercover Odyssey into China's Terrifying Surveillance Dystopia of the Future (PublicAffairs, 2021)
Samsung Rising

Samsung Rising
Cain has written a book, Samsung Rising, due out from Crown. The book charts the rise of Samsung and its influence on global technology industries and South Korea's politics and culture. This became more topical following the arrest and sentencing of Lee Jae-yong at Samsung. Cain argues Samsung's alleged influence and power can be seen when Lee walked free and received a suspended sentence.

According to The Financial Times, Geoffrey Cain does his material proud [and] marshals [it] around episodes and milestones. This allows for a few cliffhanger chapter endings, while also enabling the characters’ foibles to shine through.

The Perfect Police State
Cain wrote and released the book, The Perfect Police State: An Undercover Odyssey into China's Terrifying Surveillance Dystopia of the Future, in 2022.  According to a Kirkus starred review, the book is “A prescient, alarming work on the overreach of technology and state power.”

References

Year of birth missing (living people)
Living people
American male journalists
American business and financial journalists